Rodger or Roger Young may refer to:

People
Roger Arliner Young (1899–1964), American biologist
Rodger Young (1918–1943), US Medal of Honor recipient
Roger Carl Young (born 1941), Canadian politician
Roger Young (director) (born 1942), American television director
Roger Young (rugby union) (born 1943), Ireland and British Lions player
Roger Young (cyclist) (born 1953), American Olympic cyclist

Other uses
Rodger Young Village, a 1946 Los Angeles public housing project
 TFCT Rodger Young, a fictional starship in the novel Starship Troopers
"Rodger Young", a 1964 episode of the TV series The Great Adventure 

Young, Roger